Albac is a commune located in Alba County, Transylvania, Romania. It has a population of 2,220, and is composed of sixteen villages: Albac, Bărăști, Budăiești, Cionești, Costești, Dealu Lămășoi, Deve, După Pleșe, Fața, Pleșești, Potionci, Rogoz, Roșești, Rusești, Sohodol, and Tamborești.

The administrative center of the commune is Albac village, which is located on the DN75 road,  from Câmpeni, and is traversed by the Arieșul Mare River.

References

Communes in Alba County
Localities in Transylvania